Karam may refer to

Karam, Iran, or Koram, a village in Kerman Province
Karam (album), by Kimi Djabate, 2009 
Karam (festival), a Hindu religious festival for the worship of god Karam-Devta
Karam (film), a 2005 Indian Hindi-language action thriller film 
Karam (name), a given name and surname
El Karam, a political party in Mauritania
Jamia Al-Karam, an Islamic college in Eaton, UK
Al Karam Secondary School, Islamic boarding school

See also

Garam (disambiguation)
Carrom, a family of tableboard games
Karim (disambiguation)
Karem (disambiguation)
Karamah (disambiguation)
Karameh (disambiguation)
Karamat (disambiguation)
Kerem, a name
Kerim, a name